Lazarus is a former champion New Zealand Standardbred race-horse and is now a stud stallion. 

He was trained by Mark Purdon and Natalie Rasmussen. Driven by Mark Purdon he won the following major races in New Zealand and Australia:

 2015 New Zealand Yearling Sales 2YO Open Mobile Pace.
 2015 Harness Jewels 2YO Emerald.
 2015 NRM Sires Stakes Series Final.
 2015 New Zealand Yearling Sales Series Final.
 2016 Victoria Derby.
 2016 New Zealand Trotting Derby.
 2016 Great Northern Derby
 2016 New Zealand Trotting Cup.
 2016 New Zealand Free For All.
 2017 Victoria Cup
 2017 Chariots Of Fire
 2017 Inter Dominion Pacing Championship at Gloucester Park, Perth beating home Chicago Bull and Tiger Tara.
 2017 New Zealand Trotting Cup.
 2018 A G Hunter Cup

After he won his second NZ Trotting Cup in November 2017, he headed overseas firstly to Australia and then to the United States and Canada where he performed with distinction, including winning the $325,000 Dan Patch Stakes on debut at Hoosier Park.

Following his retirement as a racehorse Lazarus was put to stallion duties, initially standing in North America and New South Wales.  He served 136 mares in his first season in North America.  He was later moved to the South Auckland stud farm Alabar.

See also
 Harness racing in New Zealand

References

Lazarus - Alabar Farm

2012 racehorse births
Inter Dominion winners
New Zealand standardbred racehorses
New Zealand Trotting Cup winners